Elaeocarpus reticosus is a species of flowering plant in the Elaeocarpaceae family. It is a tree endemic to Peninsular Malaysia.

It is threatened by habitat loss. Some populations are protected in Taman Negara.

References

reticosus
Endemic flora of Peninsular Malaysia
Trees of Peninsular Malaysia
Conservation dependent plants
Taxonomy articles created by Polbot